John Westbrook (January 9, 1789 – October 8, 1852) was a Democratic member of the U.S. House of Representatives from Pennsylvania.

John Westbrook was born in Sussex County, New Jersey.  He moved with his parents to Pike County, Pennsylvania, in 1792 and settled near Dingmans Ferry, Pennsylvania.  He attended private schools and was engaged in lumbering and agricultural pursuits.  He served as a colonel in the State militia in 1812 and as sheriff of Pike County in 1817.  He was a member of the Pennsylvania House of Representatives in 1833.

Westbrook was elected as a Democrat to the Twenty-seventh Congress.  He declined to be a candidate for reelection in 1842 to the Twenty-eighth Congress.  He resumed agricultural pursuits and died near Dingmans Ferry in 1852.  Interment in Laurel Hill Cemetery in Milford, Pennsylvania.

Sources

The Political Graveyard

1789 births
1852 deaths
Democratic Party members of the Pennsylvania House of Representatives
Democratic Party members of the United States House of Representatives from Pennsylvania
19th-century American politicians
People from Pike County, Pennsylvania